One of My Kind is a 2009 documentary filmed about Conor Oberst and the Mystic Valley Band. It documents their tour, life in Mexico, and the recording of their new album, Outer South. This documentary was provided for free, in hopes that the viewers would donate to one of the numerous charities on the sponsoring website.

In May 2012, the film was released on DVD by Team Love. The DVD was accompanied by an album of outtakes by The Mystic Valley Band, and all the tracks from Gentleman's Pact.

Track listing
"One of My Kind"
"Gentleman's Pact"
"Corrina, Corrina"
"Synesthete Song"
"Breezy"
"Central City"
"I Got the Reason #1"
"Phil's Song (Learn to Stop Time)"
"Normal"
"Kodachrome"
"White Shoes (Reprise)"

References

Documentary films about music and musicians
Conor Oberst albums
2009 films
2009 documentary films